Giacomo di Santa Lucia (died 1482) was a Roman Catholic prelate who served as Archbishop (personal title) of Patti (1480–1482) and Archbishop of Messina (1474–1480).

Biography
Giacomo di Santa Lucia was ordained a priest in the Order of Friars Minor. On 23 May 1474, he was appointed by Pope Sixtus IV as Archbishop of Messina. On 7 July 1480, he was appointed by Pope Sixtus IV as Archbishop (personal title) of Patti and Titular Archbishop of Philippi. He served as Archbishop of Patti until his death in 1482.

References

External links and additional sources
 (for Chronology of Bishops) 
 (for Chronology of Bishops)  
 (for Chronology of Bishops) 
 (for Chronology of Bishops) 

1482 deaths
15th-century Italian Roman Catholic archbishops
Bishops appointed by Pope Sixtus IV
Franciscan bishops
15th-century Roman Catholic bishops in Sicily